Petrosport Football Club is a Gabonese football club founded in 1956 and based in Port-Gentil, Ogooué-Maritime province. They play in the Gabon Championnat National D3.

The team was founded in 1956.

Achievements
Gabon Championnat National D1: 1
 1975–1976

Stadium
Currently the team plays at the Stade Pierre Claver Divounguy.

References

External links
(in Spanish)
(in French)

Football clubs in Gabon
Port-Gentil
Association football clubs established in 1956
1956 establishments in Gabon